Pyroclastic rocks (derived from the , meaning fire; and , meaning broken) are clastic rocks composed of rock fragments produced and ejected by explosive volcanic eruptions. The individual rock fragments are known as pyroclasts. Pyroclastic rocks are a type of volcaniclastic deposit, which are deposits made predominantly of volcanic particles. 'Phreatic' pyroclastic deposits are a variety of pyroclastic rock that forms from volcanic steam explosions and they are entirely made of accidental clasts. 'Phreatomagmatic' pyroclastic deposits are formed from explosive interaction of magma with groundwater.

Unconsolidated accumulations of pyroclasts are described as tephra. Tephra may become lithified to a pyroclastic rock by cementation or chemical reactions as the result of the passage of hot gases (fumarolic alteration) or groundwater (e.g. hydrothermal alteration and diagenesis) and burial, or, if it is emplaced at temperatures so hot that the soft glassy pyroclasts stick together at point contacts, and deform: this is known as welding.

One of the most spectacular types of pyroclastic deposit is an ignimbrite, which is the deposit of a ground-hugging pumiceous pyroclastic density current (a rapidly flowing hot suspension of pyroclasts in gas). Ignimbrites may be loose deposits or solid rock, and they can bury entire landscapes. An individual ignimbrite can exceed 1000 km3 in volume, can cover 20,000 km2 of land, and may exceed 1 km in thickness, for example where it is ponded within a volcanic caldera.

Classification
Pyroclasts include juvenile pyroclasts derived from chilled magma, mixed with accidental pyroclasts, which are fragments of country rock. Pyroclasts of different sizes are classified (from smallest to largest) as volcanic ash, lapilli, or volcanic blocks (or, if they exhibit evidence of having been hot and molten during emplacement, volcanic bombs). All are considered to be pyroclastic because they were formed (fragmented) by volcanic explosivity, for example during explosive decompression, shear, thermal decrepitation, or by attrition and abrasion in a volcanic conduit, volcanic jet, or pyroclastic density current.

Pyroclasts are transported in two main ways: in atmospheric eruption plumes, from which pyroclasts settle to form topography-draping pyroclastic fall layers, and by pyroclastic density currents (PDCs) (including pyroclastic flows and pyroclastic surges), from which pyroclasts are deposited as pyroclastic density current deposits, which tend to thicken and coarsen in valleys, and thin and fine over topographic highs.

During Plinian eruptions, pumice and ash are formed when foaming silicic magma is fragmented in the volcanic conduit, because of rapid shear driven by decompression and the growth of microscopic bubbles. The pyroclasts are then entrained with hot gases to form a supersonic jet that exits the volcano, admixes and heats cold atmospheric air to form a vigorously buoyant eruption column that rises several kilometers into the stratosphere and cause aviation hazards. Particles fall from atmospheric eruption plumes and accumulate as layers on the ground, which are described as fallout deposits. 

Pyroclastic density currents arise when the mixture of hot pyroclasts and gases is denser than the atmosphere and so, instead of rising buoyantly, it spreads out across the landscape. They are one of the greatest hazards at a volcano, and may be either 'fully dilute' (dilute, turbulent ash clouds, right down to their lower levels) or 'granular fluid based' (the lower levels of which comprise a concentrated dispersion of interacting pyroclasts and partly trapped gas). The former type are sometimes called pyroclastic surges (even though they may be sustained rather than "surging") and lower parts of the latter are sometimes termed pyroclastic flows (these, also, can be sustained and quasi steady or surging). As they travel, pyroclastic density currents deposit particles on the ground, and they entrain cold atmospheric air, which is then heated and thermally expands. Where the density current becomes sufficiently dilute to loft, it rises into the atmosphere as a 'phoenix plume' (or 'co-PDC plume'). These phoenix plumes typically deposit thin ashfall layers that may contain little pellets of aggregated fine ash.

Hawaiian eruptions such as those at Kīlauea produce an upward-directed jet of hot droplets and clots of magma suspended in gas; this is called a lava fountain or 'fire-fountain'. If sufficiently hot and liquid when they land, the hot droplets and clots of magma may agglutinate to form 'spatter' ('agglutinate'), or fully coalesce to form a clastogenic lava flow.

See also
Silicon dioxide

References

Other reading
 Blatt, Harvey and Robert J. Tracy (1996) Petrology: Igneous, Sedimentary, and Metamorphic, W.H.W. Freeman & Company; 2nd ed., pp. 26–29; 
 Branney, M.J., Brown, R.J. and Calder, E. (2020) Pyroclastic Rocks. In: Elias, S. and Alderton D. (eds) Encyclopedia of Geology. 2nd Edition. Elsevier. 

Petrology
Volcanology
Volcanic rocks
Articles containing video clips